Two ships of the Japanese Navy have been named Tsuta:

 , a  launched in 1921 she was renamed Patrol Boat No.35 in 1940 and lost in 1942.
 , a  launched in 1944 and ceded to China as ROCN Hua Yang in 1947. She was struck in 1954.

Imperial Japanese Navy ship names
Japanese Navy ship names